The United Kingdom Special Envoy for Post-Holocaust Issues is responsible for developing and implementing UK Government policy with respect to encouraging the restitution of Holocaust-era assets, including art and immovable property; ensuring the accessibility and preservation of the Bad Arolsen archival record of the Nazi era and its aftermath, and promoting Holocaust education, remembrance and research.

Robert Andrew Burns served as the first envoy from 2010 to 2015. He was succeeded by Eric Pickles, who was appointed in 2015.

References

Government of the United Kingdom